The Laurence Olivier Award for Best Actress in a Play is an annual award presented by the Society of London Theatre in recognition of achievements in commercial London theatre. The awards were established as the Society of West End Theatre Awards in 1976, and renamed in 1984 in honour of English actor and director Laurence Olivier.

This award was introduced in 1985, as Actress of the Year, then retitled to its current name for the 1993 ceremony. Prior to this award, from 1976–1984 (and again in 1988), there was a pair of awards given each year for this general category, one for Actress of the Year in a New Play and the other for Actress of the Year in a Revival.

Winners and nominees

1980s

1990s

2000s

2010s

2020s

Multiple awards and nominations for Best Actress
Note: The below awards and nominations include individuals awarded and nominated under the now-defunct categories Actress of the Year in a New Play and Actress of the Year in a Revival as well as the current combined Best Actress category.

Awards
Four awards
Judi Dench

Three awards
Clare Higgins

Two awards
Eileen Atkins
Lindsay Duncan
Fiona Shaw
Frances de la Tour
Dorothy Tutin
Margaret Tyzack
Zoë Wanamaker

Nominations
Nine nominations
Judi Dench

Six nominations
Eileen Atkins
Penelope Wilton

Five nominations
Sinéad Cusack
Glenda Jackson
Janet McTeer
Kristin Scott Thomas
Juliet Stevenson
Maggie Smith
Zoë Wanamaker

Four nominations
Lindsay Duncan
Clare Higgins
Helen Mirren
Diana Rigg
Fiona Shaw
Harriet Walter

Three nominations
Gillian Anderson
Lesley Manville
Joan Plowright
Vanessa Redgrave
Imelda Staunton
Frances de la Tour

Two nominations

See also
 Evening Standard Theatre Award for Best Actress
Critics' Circle Theatre Award for Best Actress
Tony Award for Best Actress in a Play
Drama Desk Award for Outstanding Actress in a Play

References

External links
 

Actress
Theatre acting awards
Awards for actresses